Saif Uddin Ahmad (born 28 February 1957) is a British humanitarian and was Chief Executive Officer of Al-Khair Foundation. He was formerly the chief executive officer of UK charities Muslim Aid and Islamic Help, and he also founded the charities Faith Regen foundation, MADE in Europe and Global One 2015.

Early life
Ahmad completed his B.Com. (Hon.) in 1978, his M.Com. in 1980, MBA in 1985, and MCIH in 2001.

Career
In 1998, Ahmad became chief executive officer (CEO) at the North London Muslim Housing Association where he was recognised by the Chartered Institute of Housing with membership for distinguished achievements.

In 2001, Ahmad founded the Faith Regen Foundation, the UK's first multi-faith regeneration agency that seeks to create employment and education opportunities for some of the UK's poorest communities.

In 2006, he was appointed CEO of Muslim Aid. At Muslim Aid, he led a programme of organisational development, which doubled the charity's income and established the organisation as a key global player in the development sector. He successfully built partnerships with a range of organisations and funders including Department for International Development (DFID), agencies, ECHO and United Methodist Committee on Relief (UMCOR).

In 2009, he founded MADE in Europe, a Muslim-led movement of young people campaigning for good causes, such as ethical farming and climate control.

In 2010, he founded Global One 2015, an international aid and development organisation with a focus on women's and children's livelihoods, WASH, maternal health and sustainable agriculture. In 2013, he was appointed CEO of Faith Regen Foundation and Islamic Help. In May 2015, he was appointed CEO of Al-Khair Foundation to spearhead and streamline its regional and international efforts.

Ahmad has worked with the local and central government for over 30 years, as well as in the private and voluntary sectors. He has sat on numerous boards and committees including the Policy Action Team of the Social Exclusion Unit of the Cabinet Office; the National Young People's Learning Committee of the Learning and Skills Council; and the Regeneration Practitioners' Group of the Home Office.

Personal life
Ahmad lives in London with his wife, Husna Ahmad, who is CEO of Global One 2015 and secretary-general at the World Muslim Leadership Forum. He has six children (born between 1983 and 2005).

See also
British Bangladeshi
List of British Bangladeshis

References

External links
Faith Regen Foundation website
Al-Khair Foundation website

1957 births
Living people
Bangladeshi Muslims
British Muslims
Bangladeshi emigrants to England
British people of Bangladeshi descent
Naturalised citizens of the United Kingdom
British humanitarians
British chief executives
People from Cricklewood
20th-century Bengalis
21st-century Bengalis

bn:সাইফ উদ্দিন আহমদ